In virology, the tombusvirus internal replication element (IRE) is a segment of RNA located within the region coding for p92 polymerase.  This element is essential for viral replication; specifically, it is thought to be required at an early stage of replication, such as template recruitment and/or replicase complex assembly.

Other non-coding RNA structures in Tombusvirus include the 3' UTR region IV and 5' UTR.

References

External links
 

Cis-regulatory RNA elements